Andrew Nelson Lytle (December 26, 1902 – December 12, 1995) was an American novelist, dramatist, essayist and professor of literature.

Early life
Andrew Nelson Lytle was born on December 26, 1902, in Murfreesboro, Tennessee. He graduated from Vanderbilt University in 1925.

Career
Lytle's first literary success came as a result of his association with the Southern Agrarians, a movement whose members included poets Robert Penn Warren and Allen Tate, whom Lytle knew from Vanderbilt University. The group of poets, novelists and writers published the 1930s I'll Take My Stand, which expressed their philosophy. The work was attacked by contemporaries, and current scholars believe it to be a reactionary and romanticized defense of the Old South and the Lost Cause of the Confederacy.  It ignored slavery and denounced "progress", for example, and some critics considered it to be moved by nostalgia

In 1948, Lytle helped start the Master of Fine Arts program at the University of Florida.

Lytle first published a biography of Nathan Bedford Forrest, the Confederate general of the American Civil War: Bedford Forrest and his Critter Company (1931).  Lytle went on to write more than a dozen books, including novels, collected short stories, and collections of essays on literary and cultural topics.

Most critics consider The Velvet Horn (1957) to be Lytle's best work.  It was nominated for the National Book Award for fiction.  His 1973 memoir, A Wake For The Living, is a tour-de-force in Southern storytelling, combining a deep religious sensibility, an expansive view of history that links events across decades and even centuries, and—sometimes—bawdy family tales.

Lytle served as editor of the Sewanee Review from 1961 to 1973 while he was a professor at the University of the South.  During Lytle's tenure,  the Review became one of the nation's most prestigious literary magazines.  Lytle was an early champion of Flannery O'Connor's work.  Lytle encouraged many writers, including Allen Tate and Robert Penn Warren, but also Elizabeth Bishop, Caroline Gordon, and Robert Lowell.  His insightful criticism often improved their work.

Lytle taught literature and creative writing at the University of Florida, where he had Merrill Joan Gerber, Madison Jones and Harry Crews as students.

Though Lytle retired from the University of the South in 1973, he never fully retired from either writing or teaching.  In the last years of his life, he had what he called the "great pleasure" of seeing most of his earlier books come back into print.  Several university presses published collections of his stories and essays.

Personal life and death
Lytle was the owner of Cornsilk, a historic house in Cross Plains, Tennessee, in the 1940s. He died on December 13, 1995, in Monteagle, Tennessee, and was buried at the University of the South Cemetery, Sewanee, Tennessee.

Lytle Street in Murfreesboro is named after his ancestor William Lytle, of Hillsboro, N.C. who served in the Sixth, First, and Fourth regiments of the North Carolina Line during the Revolutionary War. He moved to Tennessee about 1790.

Works
Bedford Forrest and His Critter Company (1931)
The Long Night (1936)
At the Moon's Inn (1941)
A Name for Evil (1947)
The Velvet Horn (1957)
A Novel, a Novella, and Four Stories (1958)
The Hero with the Private Parts: Essays (1966) 
Craft and Vision: The Best Fiction from the Sewanee Review (1971) (edited)
A Wake for the Living: A Family Chronicle (1975)
The Lytle-Tate Letters: The Correspondence of Andrew Lytle and Allen Tate (1987) (edited by Thomas Daniel Young and Elizabeth Sarcone)
Southerners and Europeans: Essays in a Time of Disorder (1988)
From Eden to Babylon: The Social and Political Essays of Andrew Nelson Lytle (1990) (edited by M. E. Bradford)
Kristin: A Reading (1992)

References

External links 
 John Jeremiah Sullivan, "Mister Lytle: An Essay", Paris Review, Fall 2010
 Stuart Wright Collection: Andrew Nelson Lytle Papers (#1169-006), East Carolina Manuscript Collection, J. Y. Joyner Library, East Carolina University

1902 births
1995 deaths
Southern Agrarians
American magazine editors
20th-century American novelists
American male novelists
People from Monteagle, Tennessee
Sewanee: The University of the South faculty
University of Florida faculty
Vanderbilt University alumni
Novelists from Tennessee
Yale School of Drama alumni
American male short story writers
20th-century American dramatists and playwrights
20th-century American biographers
American male essayists
American male dramatists and playwrights
Writers of American Southern literature
20th-century American short story writers
20th-century American male writers
Novelists from Florida
20th-century American essayists
American male biographers